Young Fury is a 1965 American Western film directed by Christian Nyby and written by Steve Fisher. The film stars Rory Calhoun, Virginia Mayo, William Bendix, Lon Chaney Jr., Richard Arlen and John Agar. The film was released in February 1965, by Paramount Pictures.

Plot
Pursued by the Dawson gang, Clint McCoy returns to his old hometown for the first time in many years. He left long ago after the infidelity of wife Sara, leaving her and their infant son Tige behind.

Tige is now a teenager. He believes his mother to be dead and hates his father for deserting them. When he comes to town with his teenage gang (the Hellion gang), Tige encounters the saloonkeeper, Sara, but doesn't realize that she is his mother.

Calling his own father out for a gunfight, Tige does not get the better of him, but Clint refuses to kill him. More than half of Tige's gang leave town before the Dawson gang arrive.  One of Tige's gang acts as lookout for Clint, signalling to him when the Dawsons arrive.  The Dawsons then shoot the lookout.  Tige then sits in the saloon to watch the Dawsons do away with Clint, but when Sara gets a rifle to go and help Clint she addresses Tige as her son and then goes outside, where she is mortally wounded. As she is dying, Sara explains who she is and why her father left. Tige then joins his father against the Dawsons.

Cast
 Rory Calhoun as Clint McCoy
 Virginia Mayo as Sara McCoy
 William Bendix as Joe, The Blacksmith
 Lon Chaney Jr. as Ace, The Bartender
 Richard Arlen as Sheriff Jenkins
 John Agar as Dawson
 Preston Pierce as Tige McCoy
 Linda Foster as Sally Miller
 Robert Biheller as Biff Dane
 Jody McCrea as Stone
 Merry Anders as Alice
 Marc Cavell as Pancho
 Jerry Summers as Gabbo
 Jay Ripley as "Slim"
 Kevin O'Neal as Curley
 Dal Jenkins as Sam
 Fred Alexander as "Pony"
 Rex Bell Jr. as Farmer
 Joan Huntington as Kathy
 Regis Parton as Deputy Willie
 William Wellman Jr. as Peters
 Steve Condit as Tim
 Sailor Vincent as The Merchant 
 Jorge Moreno as The Mexican
 Bill Clark as Brady
 Dave Dunlop as Smith
 Jesse Wayne as Member of The Hellion Gang
 Bob Miles as Member of The Hellion Gang 
 Eddie Hice as Member of The Hellion Gang
 Fred Krone as Member of The Hellion Gang
 Joe Finnegan as Member of The Hellion Gang
 Kent Hays as Member of The Hellion Gang

See also
List of American films of 1965

References

External links 
 

1965 films
1965 Western (genre) films
American Western (genre) films
1960s English-language films
Films directed by Christian Nyby
Paramount Pictures films
1960s American films